Giuseppe Fausto Modugno (born 1960 in Bologna), is an Italian pianist.

Biography 

Soloist and lecturer., is internationally active as a concert pianist.

He has won seven national competitions and two international competitions as soloist and as duettist. He has enjoyed success both as a soloist and playing with an orchestra, and he habitually plays in the major concert halls in Italy and abroad. He has recorded for the RAI broadcasting company and has been on tours to Russia, Germany, Spain, the United States, Japan and other countries, playing in prestigious venues and major concert halls. Since 2001 he has been regularly invited by the University of California to give Master classes and concerts both as a soloist and with chamber ensembles.

In 1983 he attended the course of the Accademia Chigiana in Siena in Guido Agosti's class, not only obtaining his diploma but also gaining a grant as one of the best players.

From 2004 to 2007 was artistic secretary for the ‘Orchestra Mozart’ directed by Claudio Abbado (www.orchestramozart.com) and is currently manager of the "Orchestra Mozart Academy" (www.accademiaorchestramozart.it). For years he has been passionately involved, both at the Accademia Filarmonica of Bologna and in other prestigious musical academies, in preparing series of conferences and concert-conferences which he frequently gives on composers and on the historical and aesthetic background to major classical works. He has appeared on many occasions on RAI TV programmes with Corrado Augias, both playing as well as illustrating the music he plays. Since 2003 he has been Artistic Director and Teacher of Music Summer Courses at the “Campus degli Incamminati” in Modigliana (www.incamminati.com).

He holds the post of Professor of Principal piano at the Musical academy "Vecchi-Tonelli" in Modena.

Recordings 
 Nuova Era, CD with the complete works for piano-four hands by F. Mendelssohn with Alberto Spinelli
Tactus, CD with music by Stefano Golinelli.
 Tactus, CD with music by Stefano Liverani.
 , CD with the complete works for piano-four hands by W.A. Mozart, CD with Sonatas for cello and piano by Johannes Brahms
 Concerto un CD with music by F.J. Haydn
 Repubblica, a series of 16 DVD about classical music with Corrado Augias

Related voices 

 Accademia Filarmonica di Bologna
 Franco Scala

References

External links 
 Official site

Italian classical pianists
Male classical pianists
Italian male pianists
Living people
1960 births
21st-century classical pianists
21st-century Italian male musicians